Herbert White (6 June 1907 – 8 April 1944) was an Australian rules football player at the Melbourne Football Club in the Victorian Football League (VFL).

Football
In 1926, he became one of the club's premiership players, under the auspices of captain-coach Albert Chadwick.

White made his debut against  in Round 1 of the 1926 VFL season, at the Melbourne Cricket Ground.

He has been given the Melbourne Heritage Number of 439, based on the order of his debut for the club.

See also
 1927 Melbourne Carnival

Footnotes

External links

 

1907 births
1944 deaths
Melbourne Football Club players
Northcote Football Club players
Australian rules footballers from Victoria (Australia)
Melbourne Football Club Premiership players
One-time VFL/AFL Premiership players